The 142nd meridian east of Greenwich is a line of longitude that extends from the North Pole across the Arctic Ocean, Asia, the Pacific Ocean, Australasia, the Indian Ocean, the Southern Ocean, and Antarctica to the South Pole.

The 142nd meridian east is the estimated location of the boundary between Spain and Portugal (as per the Treaty of Zaragoza) signed on 22 April 1529. Consequently, at Possession Island 142°24'E, just before sunset on Wednesday 22 August 1770, Captain Cook declared the coast to be British territory in the name of King George III.  The Coast to the west was already Dutch territory.

The 142nd meridian east forms a great circle with the 38th meridian west.

From Pole to Pole
Starting at the North Pole and heading south to the South Pole, the 142nd meridian east passes through:

{| class="wikitable plainrowheaders"
! scope="col" width="130" | Co-ordinates
! scope="col" | Country, territory or sea
! scope="col" | Notes
|-
| style="background:#b0e0e6;" | 
! scope="row" style="background:#b0e0e6;" | Arctic Ocean
| style="background:#b0e0e6;" |
|-
| 
! scope="row" | 
| Sakha Republic — Kotelny Island, New Siberian Islands
|-
| style="background:#b0e0e6;" | 
! scope="row" style="background:#b0e0e6;" | East Siberian Sea
| style="background:#b0e0e6;" | Sannikov Strait
|-
| 
! scope="row" | 
| Sakha Republic — Great Lyakhovsky Island, New Siberian Islands
|-
| style="background:#b0e0e6;" | 
! scope="row" style="background:#b0e0e6;" | East Siberian Sea
| style="background:#b0e0e6;" | Laptev Strait
|-valign="top"
| 
! scope="row" | 
| Sakha Republic Khabarovsk Krai — from 
|-
| style="background:#b0e0e6;" | 
! scope="row" style="background:#b0e0e6;" | Sea of Okhotsk
| style="background:#b0e0e6;" |
|-
| 
! scope="row" | 
| Sakhalin Oblast — island of Sakhalin
|-
| style="background:#b0e0e6;" | 
! scope="row" style="background:#b0e0e6;" | Strait of Tartary
| style="background:#b0e0e6;" |
|-
| 
! scope="row" | 
| Sakhalin Oblast — island of Sakhalin
|-
| style="background:#b0e0e6;" | 
! scope="row" style="background:#b0e0e6;" | Strait of Tartary
| style="background:#b0e0e6;" |
|-
| 
! scope="row" | 
| Sakhalin Oblast — island of Sakhalin
|-
| style="background:#b0e0e6;" | 
! scope="row" style="background:#b0e0e6;" | Strait of Tartary
| style="background:#b0e0e6;" |
|-
| 
! scope="row" | 
| Sakhalin Oblast — island of Sakhalin
|-
| style="background:#b0e0e6;" | 
! scope="row" style="background:#b0e0e6;" | La Pérouse Strait
| style="background:#b0e0e6;" |
|-
| 
! scope="row" | 
| Hokkaidō Prefecture — island of Hokkaidō
|-
| style="background:#b0e0e6;" | 
! scope="row" style="background:#b0e0e6;" | Pacific Ocean
| style="background:#b0e0e6;" |
|-
| 
! scope="row" | 
| Iwate Prefecture — island of Honshū
|-valign="top"
| style="background:#b0e0e6;" | 
! scope="row" style="background:#b0e0e6;" | Pacific Ocean
| style="background:#b0e0e6;" | Passing just west of the island of Chichi-jima, Tokyo Prefecture,  (at ) Passing just west of the island of Haha-jima, Tokyo Prefecture,  (at )
|-
| 
! scope="row" | 
|
|-
| style="background:#b0e0e6;" | 
! scope="row" style="background:#b0e0e6;" | Arafura Sea
| style="background:#b0e0e6;" | Passing just west of the Torres Strait Islands,  (at )
|-
| style="background:#b0e0e6;" | 
! scope="row" style="background:#b0e0e6;" | Gulf of Carpentaria
| style="background:#b0e0e6;" |
|-valign="top"
| 
! scope="row" | 
| Queensland New South Wales — from  Victoria — from 
|-
| style="background:#b0e0e6;" | 
! scope="row" style="background:#b0e0e6;" | Indian Ocean
| style="background:#b0e0e6;" | Australian authorities consider this to be part of the Southern Ocean
|-
| 
! scope="row" | 
| Victoria — Lady Julia Percy Island
|-
| style="background:#b0e0e6;" | 
! scope="row" style="background:#b0e0e6;" | Indian Ocean
| style="background:#b0e0e6;" | Australian authorities consider this to be part of the Southern Ocean
|-
| style="background:#b0e0e6;" | 
! scope="row" style="background:#b0e0e6;" | Southern Ocean
| style="background:#b0e0e6;" |
|-
| 
! scope="row" | Antarctica
| Adélie Land, claimed by 
|-
|}

See also
141st meridian east
143rd meridian east

References

e142 meridian east